Kenneth Kwok Kar Lok (born 14 March 1980) is a Hong Kong football coach and former footballer. He is currently the head coach of Hong Kong Premier League club Sham Shui Po.

He is the son of former Taiwan international Kwok Kam-hung.

Club career
Kwok did not have a successful football playing career, while he only played professionally for the newly-promoted side HKFC in the 2010–11 season.

Managerial career

Pegasus
In 2012, Kwok joined Pegasus as an assistant coach alongside Chan Chi Hong.

Hong Kong youth teams
In 2015, Kwok was appointed as the head coach of Hong Kong U-17 and Hong Kong U-20. 

In August 2017, Kwok was appointed as the head coach of Hong Kong B, leading the team to defeat Macau in the 73rd Hong Kong–Macau Interport by 4–0. In December of the same year, he led the team to win the title of the 2018 Guangdong–Hong Kong Cup after beating Guangdong in the penalty shoot-out. 

In April 2018, Kwok was appointed as the head coach of Hong Kong U-23 to participate in the 2018 Asian Games. His team was finally knocked out in the Round of 16. 

In December 2018, he was appointed as the head coach of Hong Kong B again to play against Guangdong in the 2019 Guangdong–Hong Kong Cup. His team won 5–2 in aggregate eventually and successfully defended the champion.

Yuen Long
In July 2018, he was appointed as the head coach of Yuen Long. He led the club to finish 7th in the league, and his team was deemed as the overachiever of the league in the 2018–19 season. He left the club after the end of the season.

Tai Po
In July 2019, Kwok was appointed as the co-head coach of Tai Po, along with Fung Hoi Man. However, he resigned only three months later, in November 2019.

Second tenure at Yuen Long
On 1 February 2020, Kwok returned to Yuen Long, signing a contract until 31 May.

Second tenure at Pegasus
On 10 May 2020, Pegasus reached an agreement to hire Kwok as their next head coach. He signed a two year contract with the club.

Tainan City
On 5 April 2022, Tainan City reached an agreement to hire Kwok as their next head coach.

Sham Shui Po
On 3 October 2022, Kwok was appointed as the head coach of Sham Shui Po.

References

1980 births
Hong Kong footballers
Hong Kong people
Hong Kong football managers
Hong Kong First Division League players
Hong Kong FC players
Alumni of the City University of Hong Kong
Alumni of the University of Hong Kong
Living people
Association football defenders